Vidas Ginevičius (born 11 May 1978) is a 1.93 m (6'4") in height, 93 kg (205 pound) in weight, Lithuanian professional basketball point guard born in Kaunas, Lithuanian SSR, USSR.

Pro career
His career started in 1999, when he started to play for Statyba (Jonava). In the 2000–2001 season  he played for Zalgiris, but he moved during the season to Neptūnas. In 2001, he came back to Žalgiris, who loaned him for the 2003 season to Alytus. In March 2004, he left the team due to the clubs' financial problems and he came back to Žalgiris, but only for Lithuanian League games.

He has played in 19 games in the EuroLeague, during the 2004–05 Euroleague season.

Lithuanian national team
In 2004, he represented the colors and country of Lithuania, when he played for the Lithuanian national basketball team at the 2004 Olympic Basketball Tournament. He also played with Lithuania's national team in 6 games at the 2005 European Championship, which was held at Belgrade.

Career statistics

Euroleague

|-
| style="text-align:left;"| 2000–01
| style="text-align:left;"| Žalgiris
| 1 || 0 || 21.0 || .000 || .000 || .000 || 2.0 || 1.0 || 1.0 || .0 || .0 || 2.0
|-
| style="text-align:left;"| 2001–02
| style="text-align:left;"| Žalgiris
| 10 || 8 || 18.1 || .400 || .100 || .684 || 1.2 || 2.2 || 1.4 || .1 || 3.6 || 4.6
|-
| style="text-align:left;"| 2002–03
| style="text-align:left;"| Žalgiris
| 13 || 1 || 18.0 || .647 || .371 || .677 || 1.2 || .8 || 1.2 || .0 || 6.3 || 6.4
|-
| style="text-align:left;"| 2004–05
| style="text-align:left;"| Žalgiris
| 19 || 8 || 25.1 || .586 || .377 || .733 || 1.7 || 2.6 || 1.9 || .0 || 6.7 || 6.9
|-
| style="text-align:left;"| 2005–06
| style="text-align:left;"| Žalgiris
| 19 || 4 || 24.1 || .520 || .377 || .725 || 1.6 || 1.7 || 1.8 || .2 || 6.1 || 6.6
|-
| style="text-align:left;"| 2006–07
| style="text-align:left;"| Žalgiris
| 14 || 5 || 17.3 || .667 || .286 || .389 || .8 || 1.3 || 1.0 || .0 || 3.1 || 2.6
|-
| style="text-align:left;"| 2009–10
| style="text-align:left;"| Lietuvos Rytas
| 4 || 1 || 6.4 || .000 || .400 || .1000 || .5 || 1.0 || .0 || .0 || 2.0 || 1.5

Awards and achievements
Lithuanian League (LKL) Champion – 2003, 2004, 2005, 2007, 2010
Baltic League Champion – 2005
Lithuanian LKL Domestic Player of the Year – 2001
Lithuanian LKL Most Improved Player – 2001
Lithuanian LKL All-Star Game – 2002, 2005

References

1978 births
Living people
Basketball players at the 2004 Summer Olympics
Basketball players from Kaunas
BC Lietkabelis players
BC Neptūnas players
BC Nevėžis players
BC Rytas players
BC Spartak Primorye players
BC Tsmoki-Minsk players
BC Žalgiris players
Lithuanian men's basketball players
Olympic basketball players of Lithuania
Point guards